Kendra is a female given name. 

Kendra may also refer to:

 Tropical Storm Kendra, in the 1966 Atlantic hurricane season
 Hurricane Kendra (1978)
 Kendra (TV series), an American reality-based television series
 Kendra's Law, a New York State law concerning involuntary outpatient commitment